Demetrio Basilio Lakas Bahas (August 29, 1925 in Colón, PanamaNovember 2, 1999 in Panama City) was the 27th President of Panama from December 19, 1969 to October 11, 1978.

Early life and education
The son of Greek immigrants, Lakas was born in Colón. Following his education in local schools, he graduated from Texas Tech University in 1963 and was honored as a distinguished alumnus in 1970.

Lakas was nicknamed "Jimmy the Greek" due to his origin.

Presidency
Lakas was popular among his fellow businessmen. After General Omar Torrijos survived a military coup against him on 16 December 1969, Torrijos named him president of the provisional government. Lakas' presidency was primarily during rule of military officer Omar Torrijos, and was marked by media censorship and suppression of opposition movements. He also negotiated the 1977 Torrijos–Carter Treaty that transferred control of the Panama Canal from the US to Panama.

Death
He died on 2 November 1999 at the age of 74 in Panama City after succumbing to a heart disease.

References

1925 births
1999 deaths
People from Colón, Panama
Presidents of Panama
Texas Tech University alumni
Panamanian people of Greek descent